Saul Roseman (March 9, 1921 - July 2, 2011) was an American biochemist at Johns Hopkins University in Baltimore, Maryland. Among many discoveries related to carbohydrate biochemistry, he discovered the phosphotransferase system in bacteria.

Awards 
 1971 Member of the American Academy of Arts and Sciences
 1972 Member of the National Academy of Sciences
 1974 Rosenstiel Award (together with H. Ronald Kaback)
 1981 Gairdner Foundation International Award
 1984 Honorary Doctorate of the University of Lund
 1993 Karl Meyer Award of the Society for Glycobiology

References

1921 births
2011 deaths
20th-century American biochemists
21st-century American scientists
Johns Hopkins University faculty